"George" Chou Chin Nan (born 24 September 1975) is a Taiwanese racing driver currently competing in the TCR Asia Series. Having previously competed in the GT Asia Series, Porsche Carrera Cup Asia and Lamborghini Super Trofeo Asia amongst others.

Racing career
Chou began his career in 2007 in the China Formula Open Series. In 2010 he switched to the Volkswagen Scirocco Cup China. He won the Japan Touring Car Championship in 2011. From 2011-14 he raced in the Ferrari Challenge Asia Pacific, Lamborghini Super Trofeo Asia, Porsche Carrera Cup Asia and GT Asia Series.

In September 2015 it was announced that he would race in the TCR Asia Series & TCR International Series, driving a SEAT León Cup Racer for Roadstar Racing. Chou claimed his first TCR Asia pole position in Singapore.

Racing record

Complete TCR International Series results
(key) (Races in bold indicate pole position) (Races in italics indicate fastest lap)

References

External links
 

1975 births
Living people
TCR Asia Series drivers
TCR International Series drivers
Taiwanese racing drivers